USS Helenita is a name used more than once by the U.S. Navy:

 , a yacht commissioned 17 October 1917 at Morris Heights, New York.
 , a small wooden motor boat acquired by the Navy in 1919.

References 

United States Navy ship names